The Salesians of Don Bosco in the Philippines is a Catholic religious congregation of pontifical right working in the Philippines under two jurisdictions: for Luzon, the Philippine North Province (FIN); for Visayas and Mindanao, the Philippine South Province (FIS). The Salesians started working in the Philippines in 1951. The FIN has 25 canonically erected communities while the FIS has 14 canonically erected communities.

Salesian Works and Presences 
The Salesian presences refer to a physical presence of a Salesian work in a geographical area. Salesian presences may house more than one Salesian community doing one or more works. A Salesian community on the other hand is a religious house that has been canonically established by the congregation to live in a stable manner in a Salesian presence. Salesians identify eight official works:
 Oratory and Youth Center
 School and Professional Formation
 Boarding and Hostel
 Tertiary Sector
 Parish
 Social Services and Works for Youth at Risk
 Social Communication
 New Forms of Salesian Presence

Philippine North Province

Schools 
 Don Bosco College - Canlubang, Calamba, Laguna
Caritas Don Bosco School- Laguna Technopark, Biñan
 Don Bosco Technical College - Mandaluyong
 Don Bosco Technical Institute - Makati
 Don Bosco Technical Institute - Tarlac City, Tarlac
 Don Bosco Academy - Mabalacat City, Pampanga
 Don Bosco Academy - Bacolor, Pampanga

Parishes and Shrines 
 National Shrine of Mary Help of Christians - Parañaque City
 Mary Help of Christians Parish - Mayapa, Calamba, Laguna
 Diocesan Shrine of Mary Help of Christians - Canlubang, Calamba, Laguna
 San Ildefonso Parish - Makati City
 St. John Bosco Parish - Makati City
 St. John Bosco Parish and Youth Center - Tondo, Manila
 St. John Bosco Parish and Center for Young Workers - Santa Rosa, Laguna
 St. Dominic Savio Parish - Mandaluyong

Youth at Risk 
 Tuloy (formerly Tuloy sa Don Bosco) - Alabang, Muntinlupa
 Pugad (Center for Migrant Youth) - Makati

Formation Houses 
 Don Bosco Pre-novitiate Formation House (Aspirantate and Prenovitiate) - Canlubang, Calamba, Laguna
 Don Bosco School of Theology (formerly known as Don Bosco Center of Studies) - Paranaque City
 Don Bosco Center for Spirituality (Retreat House / Chapel on the Hill) - Batulao, Nasugbu, Batangas
 Sacred Heart Post Novitiate (School of Philosophy) - Canlubang, Calamba, Laguna

Philippine South Province

Schools 
 Don Bosco Technical Institute (DBTI) - Victorias City
 Don Bosco Technical College-Cebu (DBTC) (formerly Don Bosco Technology Center) - Cebu City
 Don Bosco High School (in partnership with Local Government) - Cotcot, Liloan, Cebu
 Don Bosco Training Center and Youth Center - Borongan, Easter Samar
 Don Bosco Technological Center, Inc. - Prenza, Balamban, Cebu
 Don Bosco Youth Center and Training Center - Pasil, Cebu City
 St. Louis School - Don Bosco (SLS-DB) - Dumaguete City

Parishes and Shrines 
 Archdiocesan Shrine of Our Lady of Lourdes - Punta Princesa, Cebu City
 Sto. Nino Parish - Pasil, Cebu City
 St. John Bosco Parish - Cotcot, Liloan, Cebu
 Diocesan Shrine of St. John Bosco - Murcia, Negros Occidental
 St. Joseph the Worker Parish - Victorias City, Negros Occidental
 Mary Help of Christians Parish - Dacudao, Calinan, Davao City
 Sacred Heart of Jesus Parish - Mati City, Davao Oriental

Youth at Risk 
 Don Bosco Boys Home - Liloan, Cebu
 Magone Home After Care Services - Liloan, Cebu
 Bacolod Boys Home (chaplaincy) - Bacolod City
 Don Bosco Boys Home - Dumangas, Iloilo

Formation Houses 
 Sacred Heart Novitiate - Lawaan, Talisay City, Cebu
 Don Bosco Formation Center - Lawaan, Talisay City, Cebu
 Don Bosco Center of Spirituality - Retreat House - Lawaan, Talisay City, Cebu
 Don Bosco Center of Spirituality - Retreat House - Granada, Bacolod City
 Don Bosco Center of Spirituality - Retreat House - Mambucal, Murcia, Negros Occidental
 Don Bosco House of Spirituality - Mantalongon, Dalaguete, Cebu
 Center for Lay Adults and Youth (CLAY) - Lawaan, Talisay City, Cebu

See also 
Salesians of Don Bosco
Portal - Salesians of Don Bosco Philippines
Salesians of Don Bosco - Philippine North (FIN)
Salesians of Don Bosco - Philippine South (FIS)

References

Salesian Order
Religious organizations based in Asia
Christian organizations established in 1951
1951 establishments in the Philippines